Unser täglich Brot may refer to:

 Our Daily Bread (1926 film), a silent German film
 Our Daily Bread (2005 film) (German: Unser täglich Brot), a 2005 documentary film by Nikolaus Geyrhalter
 Unser täglich Brot (1949 film), a 1949 East German film